Vitalij is a given name. Notable people with the name include:

Vitalij Aab (born 1979), German ice hockey player
Vitalij Mikhajlovich Abalakov (1906–1986), Soviet mountaineer and inventor
Vitalij Danilchenko (born 1978), Ukrainian figure skater
Vitalij Dubin (born 1980), former pair skater who competed for both Ukraine and Russia
Vitalij Lazarevics Ginzburg (1916–2009), Soviet and Russian theoretical physicist, astrophysicist, Nobel laureate, etc
Vitalij Gracev, the stage name of Vitaliy Vladasovich Grachov, a Ukrainian singer and songwriter
Vitalij Kalojev (born 1956), architect and deputy minister of housing from Vladikavkaz, North Ossetia, Russia
Vitalij Klyčko (born 1971), Ukrainian politician and the current Mayor of Kiev
Vitalij Korjakin (born 1983), male freestyle wrestler from Tajikistan
Vitalij Kozlov (born 1987), Lithuanian runner who specializes in the 800 metres
Vitalij Kuprij (born 1974), Ukrainian-American pianist, composer, music teacher and keyboardist for Ring of Fire and Trans-Siberian Orchestra
Vitalij Margulis (1928–2011), Ukrainian classical pianist
Vitalij Mikhajlov (born 1986), Belarusian long track speed skater
Vitalij Rumiancev (born 1985), alpine skier from Lithuania
Vitalij Trubila (born 1985), Belarusian football player
Vitalij Durkin (born 1979), Russian badminton player

See also
Vitali